Aleksandr Ivanovich Uspensky (27 February 1902 – January 28, 1940) was a senior officer of the Cheka, the GPU and the NKVD. Uspensky was both a perpetrator and a victim of the Great Purge.

Biography
Uspensky was born on February 14 or February 28, 1902, in to the family of a Russian forestry official. He studied at the local theological school in Tula. Uspensky made his career during the Russian Civil War. In August 1920, he joined the Cheka and in September the same year, he also became a member of the Russian Communist Party (b). Later he rose to be deputy head of security in the Kremlin. In February 1936, he was appointed deputy head of the West Siberian NKVD. In February 1937, he was appointed head of the NKVD in Orenburg. In this role, he impressed the head of the NKVD, Nikolay Yezhov with his zeal, by having 40,000 supposed 'enemies of the people' arrested. On Yezhov's instructions, all the prisoners over 70 were shot. 

Summoned to Moscow for a conference of regional NKVD heads, Uspensky was told by Yezhov on January 25, 1938, that he was being posted to Kyiv (Kiev) as head of the Ukraine NKVD. In February 1938, Yezhov visited Kyiv to give Uspensky a new target to arrest 30,000 people, in addition of the thousands who had already been arrested in Ukraine. During the visit, Yezhov and Uspensky got roaring drunk together. During this time, Uspensky actually led the arrests of about 36,000 people. In June 1938, he declared that "I consider myself a pupil of Nikolai Ivanovich Yezhov", and paid tribute to Nikita Khrushchev, then First Secretary of the Ukraine communist party, saying that "only after the faithful Stalinist Nikita Sergeyevich Khrushchev arrived in Ukraine did the smashing of the enemies of the people begin in earnest."

Flight and arrest 

In November 1938, Khrushchev received a call from Stalin telling him that Uspensky was being  recalled to Moscow, where he would be arrested. Soon afterwards, there came another phone call, from Yezhov's newly appointed deputy, Lavrentiy Beria, to say that Uspensky had disappeared. After faking his suicide, Uspensky went into hiding on 14 November - possibly having been warned by Yezhov of his impending arrest - and took refuge in the Ural Mountains. He was tracked down and arrested on April 15, 1939. On  April 29, ten NKVD officers received awards for their part in capturing Uspensky. On January 27, 1940, he was sentenced to death and executed the next day. 

Unlike many other senior officials and officers, Uspensky was not subsequently rehabilitated.

References

1902 births
1940 deaths
Communist Party of the Soviet Union members
Commissars 3rd Class of State Security
Great Purge perpetrators
People who faked their own death
First convocation members of the Verkhovna Rada of the Ukrainian Soviet Socialist Republic
20th-century Ukrainian politicians
Soviet interior ministers of Ukraine
NKVD officers